Hugo Hirst, 1st Baron Hirst (26 November 1863 – 22 January 1943), known as Sir Hugo Hirst, Bt, between 1925 and 1934, was a German-born British industrialist.

Born near Munich, Hugo Hirsch became a naturalized British subject in 1883 and changed his surname to Hirst.

He was co-founder with Gustav Binswanger of the General Electric Company plc, and in 1910 became its chairman.

He was created a baronet, of Witton in the County of Warwick, on 2 July 1925 and elevated to the peerage as Baron Hirst, of Witton in the County of Warwick, on 28 June 1934.

Hirst's eldest daughter Muriel married Leslie Gamage, the elder son of Arthur Walter Gamage, the founder of Gamages department store.  Leslie joined GEC and became chairman and managing director after Hirst's death.

As both his son and his grandson died before Hirst, his baronetcy and peerage both became extinct on his death in 1943.

References

1863 births
1943 deaths
Barons in the Peerage of the United Kingdom
General Electric Company
British businesspeople
German emigrants to England
People from the Kingdom of Bavaria
Naturalised citizens of the United Kingdom
Barons created by George V